Afrominettia is a genus of small flies of the family Lauxaniidae.

Species
A. jeanneli (Séguy, 1938)

References

Lauxaniidae
Lauxanioidea genera
Diptera of Africa